IK Heros is a sports club in Smedjebacken, Sweden, established in 1915. The club has bandy and track and field athletics sections, earlier also association football. The men's bandy team has played 11 seasons in the Swedish top division. between 1940 and 1965–1966.

The men's football team has played five seasons in the Swedish third division.

References

External links
 Bandy 
 Track and field athletics 

1915 establishments in Sweden
Athletics clubs in Sweden
Bandy clubs in Sweden
Defunct football clubs in Sweden
Sport in Dalarna County
Sports clubs established in 1915
Bandy clubs established in 1915